Events in the year 1951 in the Republic of India.

Incumbents
 President of India – Rajendra Prasad
 Prime Minister of India – Jawaharlal Nehru
 Chief Justice of India – H. J. Kania (until 6 Nov.), M. Patanjali Sastri (starting 6 Nov.)

Governors
 Assam: Jairamdas Daulatram
 Bihar: Madhav Shrihari Aney
 Maharashtra: Raja Sir Maharaj Singh
 Odisha: 
 until 5 May: Asaf Ali 
 6 May-17 July: V. P. Menon
 starting 17 July: Asaf Ali
 Punjab: Chandulal Madhavlal Trivedi
 Rajasthan: Maharaj Man Singh II
 Uttar Pradesh: Hormasji Pherozeshah Modi
 West Bengal: Kailash Nath Katju (until 1 November), Harendra Coomar Mookerjee (starting 1 November)

Events
 National income - 108,633 million
 4-11 March, First Asian Games held in Delhi.
 5 November – Central Railway is formed by the merger of several government-owned railways.
 Western Railway is formed by merging smaller railways

Law

 12 March – Patna High Court struck down Bihar Land Reforms Act, ruling it as unconstitutional on the ground that it violated Article 14 of Indian Constitution.
 2 June – First Amendment of the Constitution of India bill passed in Parliament of India with 228 votes and 20 votes against it.

 18 June – First Amendment of the Constitution of India says "state can make special provisions for advancement of any backward class"
 5 October – Supreme Court of India in Sri Sankari Prasad Singh Deo vs Union Of India And State Of Bihar case upheld the First Amendment of the Constitution of India.

Arts and literature
16 December – Salar Jung Museum is opened to the public by the Prime Minister of India Jawaharlal Nehru.

Births
1 January – Nana Patekar, actor and filmmaker.
1 March – Nitish Kumar, politician and Chief Minister of Bihar.
26 June – Pusapati Ashok Gajapathi Raju, politician and member of parliament from vizianagram.
9 July – Nav Bhatia, businessman and superfan of the Toronto Raptors.
10 July – Narayanasami Sathyamurthy, scientist.
11 July – Naramalli Sivaprasad, politician and member of parliament from Chittoor. (died 2019)
30 August – Surajit Sengupta, footballer. (died 2022)
7 September  Mammootty, actor

Deaths
 15 February – Stephen Hector Taylor-Smith, rocket scientist (born 1891).
 23 October – Jagat Singh, Third Satguru of Radha Soami Satsang Beas (born 1884).
 5 December – Abanindranath Tagore, Indian painter writer (born 1871).

See also 
 Bollywood films of 1951

References

 
India
Years of the 20th century in India